Jeanne Loury or Jane Loury (1876–1951) was a French stage and film actress.

Selected filmography
 My Aunt from Honfleur (1923)
 House in the Sun (1929)
 All That's Not Worth Love (1931)
 A Son from America (1932)
 Chotard and Company (1933)
 Topaze (1933)
 The Crisis is Over (1934)
 Seven Men, One Woman (1936)
 Bizarre, Bizarre (1937)
 The Kiss of Fire (1937)
 Monsieur Coccinelle (1938)
 Mother Love (1938)
 Cavalcade of Love (1940)

References

Bibliography
 Goble, Alan. The Complete Index to Literary Sources in Film. Walter de Gruyter, 1999.

External links

1876 births
1951 deaths
French film actresses
French silent film actresses
20th-century French actresses
French stage actresses
Actresses from Paris